Pavel Semyonovich Rybalko (23 October 1894 – 28 August 1948;) was a commander of armoured troops in the Red Army during and following World War II.

Early life and career
Pavel Rybalko served in the Russian and later the Soviet Army from 1914. He served during World War I as a soldier, as an assistant commander of the partisan squadron during the Russian Civil War, and as a cavalry commander and a commander and instructor during the Polish-Soviet War. After attending the Frunze Military Academy in 1931 to 1934, he served in the Far East in 1935 and was afterwards assigned to the Auto-Armoured Tank Directorate in Moscow.

During that period, he studied intensively the principles of modern armoured warfare, as developed by the western theorists (Generals von Kleist, Guderian and Fuller), as well as the doctrine of "deep operations," as theorized by Triandafillov and Tukhachevsky. His next assignments were as military attaché in Poland, where he was the last military attaché and left a few days before the Soviet invasion, and in China. He then took a post of lecturer in tactics at the Kazan tank school.

World War II
Very surprisingly and to his extreme frustration, Rybalko spent the first year of the war as a lecturer in Kazan. He finally got an operational assignment in May 1942, as deputy commander of the 3rd Tank Army of the Reserve of the Supreme High Command. Throughout the war, Rybalko's name was closely associated with the 3rd Tank Army. In the winter of 1942–1943, included in the Voronezh Front, his army spearheaded the different operations that tried to exploit and transform the Germans' defeat in Stalingrad into a large-scale strategic victory in the southern theater of operations. That included Operation Star in February, which was aimed at the liberation of Kharkov, one of the first major Soviet cities to be reconquered by the Red Army. However, Erich von Manstein's counteroffensive recaptured the city and inflicted serious damages to the exhausted and overextended 3rd Tank Army.

Refitted and renamed the 3rd Guards Tank Army, Rybalko's army played crucial roles in the strategic counteroffensives that followed the Battle of Kursk (Operation Kutuzov), in the recapture of Kiev (6 November 1943). The winter and the spring of 1944 saw a succession of large operations, aiming at the destruction of the southern wing of the Wehrmacht. Operations (Zhitomir-Berdichev in December 1943 to January 1944 and Proskurov-Chernivtsi in March to April 1944) succeeded at least in the complete liberation of Ukraine by the end of the summer. During the various operations, Rybalko showed impressive tactical and operational skills, particularly during the Lvov-Sandomierz Operation.

Still in command of his 3rd Guards Tank Army, Rybalko took a major place in the various operations that were launched in North Ukraine: Galicia (summer 1944) and Silesia (late 1944 and winter 1945). Finally, as part of Ivan Konev's 1st Ukrainian Front, Rybalko's army was one of the four Guards Tank armies engaged in the giant Battle for Berlin.

Immediately after the capture of Berlin, Rybalko and his tank army were tasked with the assault on the city in the Prague offensive and on 9 May liberated Prague.

Postwar
After the war, he became commander of the mechanized forces of the Red Army.

He emerged from the war as one of the most brilliant Soviet tank commanders. He fully understood the nature of armoured warfare and mastered the operational aspects of armoured armies command.

Legacy
The Tashkent Higher Tank Command School is named after him.

Awards and decorations

Soviet Union

Foreign

External links
  Biography on Generals.dk
  Biography
 Stalin's Generals, Harold Shukman Ed, Richard Woff, Phoenix Book, 2001
 Red Army Tank Commanders, Richard N. Armstrong, Schiffer Publishing, 1994

1892 births
1948 deaths
People from Sumy Oblast
People from Kharkov Governorate
Communist Party of the Soviet Union members
Soviet Marshals of Tank Troops
Soviet military attachés
Soviet military personnel of World War II
Ukrainian people of World War II
Heroes of the Soviet Union
Recipients of the Order of Lenin
Recipients of the Order of the Red Banner
Recipients of the Order of Suvorov, 1st class
Recipients of the Order of Kutuzov, 1st class
Recipients of the Order of Bogdan Khmelnitsky (Soviet Union), 1st class
Recipients of the Czechoslovak War Cross
Recipients of the Virtuti Militari (1943–1989)
Burials at Novodevichy Cemetery
Knights of the Virtuti Militari
Recipients of the Order of the Cross of Grunwald, 3rd class
Grand Crosses of the Order of the White Lion
Recipients of the Military Order of the White Lion